Qadamgah-e Hazrat-e Ali (also Romanized as Qadamgāh-e Ḩaẕrat-e ‘Alī) is a village in Dar Pahn Rural District, Senderk District, Minab County, Hormozgan Province, Iran. At the 2006 census, its population was 23, in 5 families.

References 

Populated places in Minab County